Leninkənd or Leninkend may refer to:
Leninkənd, Lachin, Azerbaijan
Mustafabəyli, Azerbaijan, formerly called Leninkənd
Çinarlı, Shamkir, Aterbaijan, also called Leninkend